Joe or Joseph Spencer may refer to:

 Joe Spencer (American football) (1923–1996), American football player
 Joe Spencer (baseball) (1919–2003), American Negro league baseball player
 Joseph Spencer (1714–1789), Connecticut lawyer, soldier, and politician
 Joseph Spencer (New York politician) (1790–1823), New York lawyer and politician
 Joseph Spencer (cricketer), English cricketer, British Army soldier and inventor
 Joe Spencer (Hollyoaks), a character in the British soap opera Hollyoaks

Other uses
 Joseph Spence (disambiguation)